Munguvini is a settlement in Kenya's Coast Province. Its geographical coordinates are 2° 1' 26" South, 40° 9' 42" East.

References 

Populated places in Coast Province